Mistley railway station is on the Mayflower Line, a branch of the Great Eastern Main Line in the East of England, serving the village of Mistley, Essex. Its three-letter station code is MIS.

The station was opened by the Eastern Union Railway in 1854. It is currently managed by Greater Anglia, which also operates all trains serving the station.

History

Mistley was opened by the Eastern Union Railway in 1854 and the brick-built two-storey Italianate station building (now in alternative use) was probably designed by Frederick Barnes.  The building is Grade II listed.

Platform 1 (London bound) and platform 2 (Harwich bound) have an operational length for four-coach trains. There is a siding on the "up" (London-bound) side at the country (east) end which earlier had additionally included a long curved incline which allowed goods movements down to the quayside using horse power. This was later replaced by a spur with a much steeper incline down to the quays on the down side at the country end.  At the London (west) end of the "down" side there are several sidings which were for movements to and from the malt works.

Services
 the typical weekday off-peak service on the line is one train per hour in each direction, although some additional services run at peak times. There is also one direct train a day on Monday to Fridays from Mistley to Ipswich (continuing on to Cambridge) during the morning peak, which is operated by a diesel unit.

References

External links

Railway stations in Essex
DfT Category F1 stations
Railway stations in Great Britain opened in 1854
Former Great Eastern Railway stations
Greater Anglia franchise railway stations
Tendring